Flamingo Entertainment Centre is the biggest entertainment centre in the Nordic countries. It is located in Vantaa next to the Jumbo Shopping Centre. Flamingo was opened in 2008 and there is a hotel, variety of entertainment activities (e.g. a movie theater, sauna, bowling, laser games, virtual experiences) and 40 different stores under its roof.

Services 

Flamingo has entertainment for kids and adults. Flamingo has the biggest indoor water park in Finland. In addition to normal swimming pools there are several water slides, kids pool and Jacuzzi. There is also a spa and wellness section for adults, with different kinds of saunas and relaxing and wellness treatments. Spa and wellness section is for adults only Formerly (20 years and above).Now 18 years and above) Under 18 years Go Spa With Adult All Times

Flamingo also has a bowling alley, a laser tag arena, a minigolf, an escape room, a 6-screen cinema, a gym, a hotel and numerous shops and restaurants.

There is a bridge that connects Flamingo with shopping centre Jumbo.

Location and transportation
Flamingo is located on the side of Ring III, near to the Tuusula Highway and next to the shopping centre Jumbo. Helsinki-Vantaa Airport is also located near Flamingo.

Car
There are 800 parking spots in Flamingo that are free for 8 hours. The parking lot is guarded by Q-Park. Entrance to the parking lot is from the Tasetie, next to the main entrance of Flamingo.

Public transportation
Flamingo is well served by the buses of the Helsinki Region Transport (HRT) around the clock.

It takes only few minutes from airport to Flamingo by buses 615 and 617. The bus stop for these buses is right next to Flamingo. The other option is to take the train I to Aviapolis railway station and take the bus 561 or 562 from there.

Other buses: from Tikkurila railway station the bus 562, from Myyrmäki railway station the buses 571, 572, 574, from Helsinki city centre buses 614, 615, 415.

References

Shopping centres in Vantaa
Entertainment venues in Finland